George Knobel (10 December 1922 – 5 May 2012) was a Dutch football manager.

Knobel was born and died in Roosendaal.  He was the coach of the Netherlands national football team for 15 matches (9 wins, 1 draw, 5 losses) from 1974 to 1976. During his period the Dutch finished third at the European Championship of 1976. He also coached Dutch clubs AFC Ajax and MVV, including a temporary spell from March to April 1982. He had a brief stint with Seiko SA in Hong Kong.

References

External links

1922 births
2012 deaths
Dutch football managers
MVV Maastricht managers
AFC Ajax managers
Beerschot A.C. managers
Netherlands national football team managers
UEFA Euro 1976 managers
Hong Kong national football team managers
Dutch expatriate football managers
Dutch expatriate sportspeople in Belgium
Expatriate football managers in Belgium
Dutch expatriate sportspeople in Hong Kong
Expatriate football managers in Hong Kong
Sportspeople from Roosendaal
Deaths from dementia in the Netherlands
Deaths from Alzheimer's disease